Cathal Séan Heffernan Andrews (born 27 April 2005) is an Irish footballer who plays for Italian club A.C. Milan, as a defender.

Early and personal life
Heffernan was born in Cork. His father Rob and mother Marian are both Olympians, in race walking and 400m relay respectively.

Club career
Heffernan began his career with Ringmahon Rangers, signing for Cork City in 2019. He made his senior debut for Cork City in the 2021 season. In March 2021 he trained with Italian clubs Juventus, A.C. Milan, Roma and Atalanta, and turned professional with Cork in June 2021.

He moved on loan to A.C. Milan in January 2022. He made his debut for Milan's under-18 team a few days later. In May 2022 he made his debut for the under-19 team.

His transfer to Milan was made permanent in June 2022.

International career
Heffernan has played for the Republic of Ireland at youth level.

References

2005 births
Living people
Republic of Ireland association footballers
Cork City F.C. players
A.C. Milan players
League of Ireland players
Association football defenders
Republic of Ireland youth international footballers
Republic of Ireland expatriate association footballers
Irish expatriates in Italy
Expatriate footballers in Italy